The Bluegrass Album is the nineteenth studio album and the first bluegrass album by American country music artist Alan Jackson. It was released on September 24, 2013 via Alan's Country Records and EMI Nashville. Jackson wrote eight songs for the album. It also includes covers of The Dillards' "There Is a Time", John Anderson's "Wild and Blue" and Bill Monroe's "Blue Moon of Kentucky". Also included is a re-recording of "Let's Get Back to Me and You" from his 1994 album Who I Am, marking the second time Jackson has included two versions of the same song on two different albums ("A Woman's Love" was originally recorded for High Mileage and was later re-recorded for Like Red on a Rose).

The album was produced by Keith Stegall and Jackson's nephew, Adam Wright (of The Wrights). It was recorded in Nashville.

"Blue Ridge Mountain Song" was released as a promotional single in advance of the album's release.

Two music videos were filmed for two songs of the album: "Blacktop"  and "Blue Ridge Mountain Song". The music video for "Blue Ridge Mountain Song" stars Jackson’s middle daughter, Ali, as the lead role.

Commercial performance
The album debuted at No. 11 on Billboard 200, No. 1 on Bluegrass Albums, and No. 3 on Top Country Albums, selling 22,000 copies in its first week. It also finished at No. 2 on the Year End Bluegrass Albums chart for 2014. It has sold 148,000 copies in the United States as of June 2015.

Track listing

Personnel
Ronnie Bowman - background vocals
Scott Coney - acoustic guitar
Tim Crouch - fiddle
Tim Dishman - upright bass
Rob Ickes - dobro
Alan Jackson - lead vocals
Don Rigsby - background vocals 
Sammy Shelor - banjo
Adam Steffey - mandolin
John Kelton - engineer and mixing
Travis Humbert - assistant engineer and cover artwork

Charts

Weekly charts

Year-end charts

References

2013 albums
Alan Jackson albums
EMI Records albums
Albums produced by Keith Stegall
Bluegrass albums